The autumnal moth (Epirrita autumnata) is a moth of the family Geometridae. The species was first described by Moritz Balthasar Borkhausen in 1794. It is found throughout the Palearctic region and the Near East and has a much wider distribution than its two close relatives (see below). In Sápmi (Lapland), in some years, the numerous autumnal moth larvae defoliate square miles of birch forests on mountains.

Description
This species is very similar to the November moth, the small Autumnal moth, and the pale November moth, and identification is usually only possible by examining the genitalia. In general, this is the least variable of the four, with melanic forms occurring less often. It is also usually on the wing earlier in the year, flying in September and October, although the flight seasons of all three species overlap.

The caterpillar feeds on a wide variety of trees and shrubs. The species overwinters as an egg.

Subspecies
E. a. altivagata
E. a. autumnata

Notes
  The flight season refers to the British Isles. This may vary in other parts of the range.

References

Chinery, Michael Collins Guide to the Insects of Britain and Western Europe 1986 (Reprinted 1991)
Skinner, Bernard Colour Identification Guide to the Moths of the British Isles 1984
Tuzun, Sadik & Bent, Elizabeth (2006). Multigenic and Induced Systemic Resistance in Plants, published by Birkhäuser, 521 pages

External links

Autumnal moth at UKMoths
Fauna Europaea
Lepiforum e.V.

Epirrita
Moths described in 1794
Moths of Japan
Moths of Europe
Taxa named by Moritz Balthasar Borkhausen